Conservation biologists have designed a variety of objective means to measure biodiversity empirically. Each measure of biodiversity relates to a particular use of the data. For practical conservationists, measurements should include . For others, a more economically defensible definition should allow the ensuring of continued possibilities for both adaptation and future use by humans, assuring environmental sustainability.

As a consequence, biologists argue that this measure is likely to be associated with the variety of genes. Since it cannot always be said which genes are more likely to prove beneficial, the best choice for conservation is to assure the persistence of as many genes as possible. For ecologists, this latter approach is sometimes considered too restrictive, as it prohibits ecological succession.

Taxonomic Diversity 
Biodiversity is usually plotted as taxonomic richness of a geographic area, with some reference to a temporal scale. Whittaker described three common metrics used to measure species-level biodiversity, encompassing attention to species richness or species evenness:
 Species richness - the simplest of the indices available.
 Simpson index
 Shannon-Wiener index

More recently, two new indices have been invented. The Mean Species Abundance Index (MSA) calculates the trend in population size of a cross section of the species. It does this in line with the CBD 2010 indicator for species abundance. The Biodiversity Intactness Index  (BII) measures biodiversity change using abundance data on plants, fungi and animals worldwide. The BII shows how local terrestrial biodiversity responds to human pressures such as land use change and intensification.

Other Measures of Diversity 
Alternatively, other types of diversity may be plotted against a temporal timescale:
 species diversity
 ecological diversity
 morphological diversity
 genetic diversity

These different types of diversity may not be independent. There is, for example, a close link between vertebrate taxonomic and ecological diversity.

Other authors tried to organize the measurements of biodiversity in the following way:
 traditional diversity measures
 species density, take into account the number of species in an area
 species richness, take into account the number of species per individuals (usually [species]/[individuals x area])
 diversity indices, take into account the number of species (the richness) and their relative contribution (the evenness); e.g.:
 Simpson index
 Shannon-Wiener index
 phylogenetic diversity measures, include information on phylogenetic relationships among species
 phylogenetic diversity (PD) index; Faith (1992)
 topology based measures
 taxonomic distinctiveness; Vane-Wright et al. (1991)
 taxonomic diversity; Warwick & Clarke (1995)
 taxonomic distinctness; Clarke & Warwick (1998)
 functional diversity measures, include information on functional traits among species 
 categoric measures
 functional group richness (FGR); e.g., Tilman et al. (1997)
 continuous measures
 with only one functional trait; e.g., Mason et al. (2003)
 multivariate measures, with many functional traits
 functional attribute diversity (FAD); Walker et al. (1999) 
 convex hull volume; Cornwell et al. (2006)
 functional diversity (FD); Petchey & Gaston (2002)

Scale 
Diversity may be measured at different scales. These are three indices used by ecologists: 
 Alpha diversity refers to diversity within a particular area, community or ecosystem, and is measured by counting the number of taxa within the ecosystem (usually species) 
 Beta diversity is species diversity between ecosystems; this involves comparing the number of taxa that are unique to each of the ecosystems.
 Gamma diversity is a measurement of the overall diversity for different ecosystems within a region.

See also 

Convention on Biological Diversity
Diversity index
Global biodiversity
List of biodiversity databases
National Biodiversity Network
Nutritional biodiversity

References

External links

 
Biodiversity
Environmental science